Shihua is a town of Gucheng County in northwestern Hubei province, China, located against the immediate backdrop of the Daba Mountains. , it has 8 residential communities and 38 villages under its administration.

Administrative divisions
Eight residential communities:
 Dongmenjie, Xihejie, Shixijie, Cangtaijie, Houfan, Minyingjingjiqu, Dayuqiaojie, Laojuntai

Thirty-eight villages:
 Jiepaiya, Hongmamiao, Tiemiaogou, Huangjiaying, Pingchuan, Peijiaqiao, Gongjiawan, Yangxiwan, Shuixingtai, Xiaxindian, Zhoujiawan, Shijiawan, Pengjiawan, Caijiaying, Gaojiachong, Dayu, Shaojialou, Doupodian, Biaojiamiao, Tuqiaogou, Tongbeimiao, Yinfan, Liangshuijing, Pengjialing, Xijiaya, Wujiazhou, Yanwan, Cangyu, Baijiayan, Tongshan, Cuihuapu, Jiangjunshan, Yangjiahu, Xiaotanshan, Chenjialou, Longjiagou, Longwan

See also 
 List of township-level divisions of Hubei

References 

Township-level divisions of Hubei